Boylston may refer to the following communities:
Canada
 Boylston, Nova Scotia

United States
 Boylston, Massachusetts
 Boylston, New York
 Boylston, Wisconsin
 Boylston Junction, Wisconsin
It may also refer to:
 Helen Dore Boylston, author of the popular "Sue Barton" nurse series
 Zabdiel Boylston, American physician
 Boylston Street in Boston, Massachusetts
 Boylston (MBTA station), a subway station in Boston